Dufur is a city in Wasco County, Oregon, United States. The population was 604 at the 2010 census.  It is a farming community where wheat, tree fruit, and grapes are important crops.

History
Dufur was incorporated on February 10, 1893, and named after Andrew Dufur and his brother Enoch Burnham Dufur.

In 2018, areas of Dufur were evacuated due to three wildfires, the Long Hollow Fire, the Substation Fire, and the South Valley Fire, which burned over 100,000 acres in total.

Geography

The hillside letter D can be seen in the northwest.

Climate
This region experiences warm (but not hot) and dry summers, with no average monthly temperatures above 68 °F.  According to the Köppen Climate Classification system, Dufur has a warm-summer Mediterranean climate, abbreviated "Csb" on climate maps.

Demographics

2010 census
As of the census of 2010, there were 604 people, 244 households, and 163 families living in the city. The racial makeup of the city was 94.5% White, 1.7% Native American, 0.2% Asian, 0.2% Pacific Islander, 1.3% from other races, and 2.2% from two or more races. Hispanic or Latino of any race were 1.5% of the population.

There were 244 households, of which 33.2% had children under the age of 18 living with them, 55.7% were married couples living together, 7.8% had a female householder with no husband present, 3.3% had a male householder with no wife present, and 33.2% were non-families. 29.5% of all households were made up of individuals, and 14% had someone living alone who was 65 years of age or older. The average household size was 2.47 and the average family size was 3.04.

The median age in the city was 42.6 years. 26.2% of residents were under the age of 18; 5.9% were between the ages of 18 and 24; 20.2% were from 25 to 44; 27.1% were from 45 to 64; and 20.5% were 65 years of age or older. The gender makeup of the city was 50.2% male and 49.8% female.

2000 census
As of the census of 2000, there were 588 people, 244 households, and 173 families living in the city. The population density was 1,007.5 people per square mile (391.4/km2). There were 265 housing units at an average density of 454.1 per square mile (176.4/km2). The racial makeup of the city was 97.45% White, 0.68% Native American, 0.34% from other races, and 1.53% from two or more races. Hispanic or Latino of any race were 1.36% of the population.

There were 244 households, out of which 32.0% had children under the age of 18 living with them, 57.8% were married couples living together, 8.2% had a female householder with no husband present, and 28.7% were non-families. 26.2% of all households were made up of individuals, and 11.9% had someone living alone who was 65 years of age or older. The average household size was 2.41 and the average family size was 2.89.

In the city, the population was spread out, with 26.5% under the age of 18, 4.4% from 18 to 24, 21.9% from 25 to 44, 28.4% from 45 to 64, and 18.7% who were 65 years of age or older. The median age was 43 years. For every 100 females, there were 103.5 males. For every 100 females age 18 and over, there were 102.8 males.

The median income for a household in the city was $37,500, and the median income for a family was $41,667. Males had a median income of $34,375 versus $19,792 for females. The per capita income for the city was $17,615. About 5.2% of families and 8.3% of the population were below the poverty line, including 10.4% of those under age 18 and 7.5% of those age 65 or over.

Culture
On the second full weekend of August, Dufur holds its annual Threshing Bee, a harvest festival celebrating the local agricultural economy.  The festival includes demonstrations of horse-drawn harvesting equipment, and a steam tractor that powers a belt-driven threshing machine.

Notable people
 Shemia Fagan, Oregon Secretary of State, former Oregon State Representative and State Senator

See also
 Great Southern Railroad
 U.S. Route 197
 Charles E. Nelson House in Dufur
 Long Hollow Fire

References

External links
 Entry for Dufur in the Oregon Blue Book
 
 Why Dufur?  Video produced by Oregon Field Guide

Cities in Oregon
Cities in Wasco County, Oregon
Populated places established in 1893
1893 establishments in Oregon